Rakeem Tyree Miles (born March 12, 1993) is an American rapper, singer, songwriter, artist and record producer from Baltimore, Maryland.
 Miles self-proclaims his own sound of "Alternative Hip Hop". He is one of the founding members of Hip-Hop collective group Organic Geniuses, which disbanded in 2017. Miles is also the founder of Weird n Awful Music Festival, an annual event to which he's currated headling acts such as Left Brain, Mike G of Odd Future, A$AP Ant of A$AP Mob and recently with Waka Flocka Flame.

Earlier life 
As a child, Rakeem was orphaned into foster care. His mother's struggle with substance abuse and behavioral issues caused him to move between multiple schools. He found an outlet of expression through Hip-Hop music being introduced musically to J Dilla, Madlib and MF Doom. Miles credits his Uncle who was a touring gospel rapper for introducing him to the East Coast Hip-Hop music scene and the lifestyle, causing him to pursue a career despite his grandmother's wishes.

Discography

Studio albums
 Depression (2012)
 Adderall (2015)
 Do They Really Love You (2016)
 Action Figure Miles (2019)

Singles
 Can't Be Friends (2016)
 A Dollar A Day(2016)
 That's My Girl(2018)
 Hard Way (2018)

Tours
Headlining
 Weird and Awful (2016–Present)

Artistry 
In an Interview with Delaware Online, Rakeem cited Pharrell Williams, The Clipse and Kanye West as a focal point of his musical inspirations.

References

1993 births
Living people
Musicians from Baltimore
Musicians from Delaware
African-American rappers
21st-century African-American people